Koderma district is one of the twenty-four districts of Jharkhand state, India, and Koderma is the administrative headquarters of this district.

Koderma district was created on 10 April 1994, after being carved out of the original Hazaribagh district. It is currently a part of the Red Corridor.

Geography
Koderma is bordered by Nawada district of Bihar on the north, the Gaya district of Bihar on the west, the Giridih district of Jharkhand on the east, and the Hazaribagh district of Jharkhand on the south.

Koderma is surrounded by forests. The main rivers of the district are Barakar, Barsoi and Sakri. Dhawajadhari Pahar is a hill dedicated to lord Shiva, where at Mahashivratri many devotees assemble to worship the god. Many devotees gather here for the festivals of durga pooja, ramnavmi, akhari pooja, etc to worship Chanchalni Maa to fulfill their desires.

Koderma district is richly endowed with natural resources. Quartz, feldspar, asbestos, blue stone, white stone and moon stone are the minerals found here. At one time, Koderma was considered as the  mica capital of India.

Politics 

 |}

Administration

Blocks (Mandals) 

Koderma district consists of six Blocks. The following are the list of the Blocks in Koderma district:

Economy
In 2006 the Indian government named Koderma one of the country's 250 most backward districts (out of a total of 640). It is one of the 21 districts in Jharkhand currently receiving funds from the Backward Regions Grant Fund Programme (BRGF).

Education
There are several schools and degree colleges in Koderma, notable institutions include: 
 
 
 Capital University, Jharkhand, established by Jharkhand Govt in 2018, in Chitragupta Nagar, Koderma, Jharkhand
 Grizzly Vidyalaya, a CBSE-affiliated residential School, located in the Damodar Valley
 Jharkhand Vidhi Mahavidyalaya
 Kailash Roy Saraswati Vidya Mandir, Jhumri Telaiya (Vidya Bharti Foundation)
 Sainik School, Tilaiya (boys-only residential school, established on 16 September 1963)
 Saraswati Shishu Mandir (established 1984), run by the Bal Bharti Samiti of Rashtriya Swayamsevak Sangh

Transport

The district has three major towns - Domchanch, Jhumri Telaiya, Koderma. Koderma, Jhumri Telaiya are located along National Highway 31, which connects Ranchi and Patna. Koderma Railway station is on the Grand Chord railway line, which connects Kolkata and Delhi.

Health

Hospitals
Sadar hospital, Koderma
Jay Prakash Hospital, Chitragupt Nagar, Jhumri Telaiya, Koderma
Hope hospital, Jhumri Telaiya, Koderma
Gayatri Hospital, Jhumri telaiya, Koderma
Holy Family Hospital, Koderma

Divisions
The district comprises six blocks: Koderma, Jainagar, Markacho, Satgawan, Chandwara and Domchanch.

The Vidhan Sabha constituency of this district are Kodarma, Barkatha and Barhi, which are part of Koderma and Hazaribag Lok Sabha constituency respectively.

Villages
 

Gumo

Demographics
According to the 2011 census Koderma district has a population of 716,259, roughly equal to the nation of Bhutan or the US state of Alaska. This gives it a ranking of 500th in India (out of a total of 640).
Its population growth rate over the decade 2001-2011 was 32.59%. Kodarma has a sex ratio of 949 females for every 1000 males, and a literacy rate of 68.35%. Schedule Castes (SC) constitutes 15.2% of the population and 0.96% are Scheduled Tribes.

84.49% are Hindus while 14.94% are Muslim.

At the time of the 2011 Census of India, 49.66% of the population in the district spoke Khortha, 43.47% Hindi, 4.69% Urdu and 0.52% Santali as their first language.

References

External links
 Official government website

 
Districts of Jharkhand
1994 establishments in Bihar